The Valdez-Trail (Copper Bluff Segment) is an historic early trail in southern Alaska.  It is a section of unpaved roadway, eight to ten feet in width, that extends roughly northward from milepost 106.5 of the Richardson Highway, between Copper Center and Glennallen.  It is a rare surviving segment of the original Valdez Trail, the first major road built in Alaska, which extends  from Valdez into the Alaskan interior.  This segment was constructed in 1900 by the Alaska Road Commission, and is now within Wrangell–St. Elias National Park and Preserve.  It was listed on the National Register of Historic Places in 1998.

See also
National Register of Historic Places listings in Copper River Census Area, Alaska

References

1900 establishments in Alaska
Buildings and structures completed in 1900
National Register of Historic Places in Copper River Census Area, Alaska
National Register of Historic Places in Wrangell–St. Elias National Park and Preserve
Roads on the National Register of Historic Places in Alaska